Sten Feldreich (born 24 July 1955) is a Swedish basketball player. He competed in the men's tournament at the 1980 Summer Olympics. He is the son of radio presenter Bengt Feldreich.

References

1955 births
Living people
Swedish men's basketball players
Olympic basketball players of Sweden
Basketball players at the 1980 Summer Olympics
Sportspeople from Stockholm
Alviks BK players